Zaprinast was an unsuccessful clinical drug candidate that was a precursor to the chemically related PDE5 inhibitors, such as sildenafil (Viagra), which successfully reached the market. It is a phosphodiesterase inhibitor, selective for the subtypes PDE5, PDE6, PDE9 and PDE11.  IC50 values are 0.76, 0.15, 29.0, and 12.0 μM, respectively.

Zaprinast inhibits the growth of asexual blood-stage malaria parasites (P. falciparum) in vitro with an ED50 value of 35 μM, and inhibits PfPDE1, a P. falciparum cGMP-specific phosphodiesterase, with an IC50 value of 3.8 μM.

Zaprinast has also been shown to activate the orphan G-protein coupled receptor known as GPR35, both in rats and humans, and to inhibit the mitochondrial pyruvate carrier.

References

Abandoned drugs
Phosphodiesterase inhibitors
PDE5 inhibitors